Florence Petty (1 December 1870 – 18 November 1948) was a Scottish cookery writer and broadcaster. During the 1910s, in the socially deprived area of Somers Town, north west London, Petty ran cookery demonstrations to working-class women to get them in the habit of cooking inexpensive and nutritious foods. Much of the instruction was done in the women's homes, allowing her to use their own limited equipment and utensils.

Petty wrote on cookery, with works aimed at fellow social workers, and with a cookery book—The Pudding Lady's Recipe Book, with Practical Hints (1917)—and pamphlet aimed at the public. Both the pamphlet and book contain practical information on how to make and use a haybox. She was a broadcaster on food and budgeting in the late 1920s and early 1930s, on the 2LO radio station for the BBC, as part of the "Household Talk" series of programmes. From 1914 until the mid-1940s she toured Britain giving lecture-demonstrations on economical ingredients and cooking methods.

Life
Florence Petty was born in Montrose, Forfar, on 1 December 1870. She was the fourth of seven children born to David James Petty, a clerk at a timber merchant, and Jane Norris ( Levie). She lived in Montrose until her early 30s when she moved to Swanley, Kent and then moved in with her sister, a former nurse, who was living in Tottenham, North London.

Petty began working at the St Pancras School for Mothers (commonly known as the Mothers' and Babies' Welcome) which was active in the deprived area of Somers Town, north west London. The Mothers' and Babies' Welcome was run by the St Pancras Mothers' and Infants' Society, an organisation formed to combat high rates of infant mortality by educating mothers on nutrition and managing the household.

Among other activities, the Mothers' and Babies' Welcome provided cookery lessons for mothers, but realised that this was of limited success as many of the women lacked the basic equipment or utensils needed. Petty was employed to provide the cookery lessons in the women's own homes, using only their own equipment and utensils. She was employed as a Lecturer and Demonstrator in Health Foods, although her students nicknamed her "The Pudding Lady" because in an attempt to get the women in the habit of cooking regularly using familiar and inexpensive ingredients, for the first three months of her demonstrations they made suet puddings—plain sweet and meat—until the women began to show pride in their ability to cook. Blake Perkins, Petty's biographer at the Dictionary of National Biography, observes that her case notes for the women she was instructing are "matter-of-fact but also sympathetic rather than clinical".

In 1910 the St Pancras School for Mothers published an account of their work in The Pudding Lady: A New Departure in Social Work, examining Petty's work and the impact she had. In the second edition, published in 1916, Charles Hecht, the secretary of the National Food Reform Association (NFRA) wrote that:

The heroine of the book, Florence Petty, has ... become a public possession, bringing to bear on the solution of national problems those rare gifts of heart and head and that unique experience which achieved such wonders ... in the homes of Somers Town.

Shortly after 1910 Petty was employed in a dental and medical centre in Newport, Essex, that had been established by Lady Meyer; she remained there until October 1914 when she was employed by the NFRA as a travelling lecturer, and the following year undertook a lecture tour around Britain to demonstrate economical ingredients and cooking methods to working-class audiences. Local media reported her activities in, among other places, Liverpool, Oxford, Nantwich, Aberdeen, Birmingham, Cardiff and Leeds. In March 1915 she spoke at the Royal Society of Medicine on behalf of the National Association for the Prevention of Infant Mortality and for the Welfare of Infancy, and in February and March 1916 she gave a series of "demonstration-lectures" on wartime cookery—aimed at social workers—at the Westminster Health Society. 

Petty wrote at least one pamphlet for the NFRA, on "Fireless Cookery"; a review in The Lancet describes a haybox as the method of cooking outlined in the pamphlet. Published in January 1916, 30,000 copies of the leaflet were sold. In 1917 she wrote a cookery book, The Pudding Lady's Recipe Book, with Practical Hints. The work contained 300 recipes on a variety of basic foods. With an acknowledgement that some foodstuffs were rationed in First World War Britain, Petty described her approach thus:

Every good cook or housekeeper is, in these days, a good patriot. By the wise choice of food and care in its preparation she may do her part in utilising to the uttermost the national resources. To this end, a number of general hints are included in the book and the recipes are, for the most part, very economical.

Ever practical with advice for those who did not have the equipment at home to prepare even basic foods, Petty included instructions to make an oven from a biscuit tin and details of how to make a haybox (which could also be used for doing the laundry, cleaning tins and saucepans and keeping butter cool in hot weather). In its first year of publication, the book sold 20,000 copies. By the time The Pudding Lady's Recipe Book was published, Petty had become a qualified sanitary inspector.

At the end of the war Petty continued lecturing on and writing about cookery. In 1921 she wrote chapters on nutrition and the care of children's teeth for Hecht's The Gateway to Health, and in 1923 she wrote the paper "The Cook as Empire Builder" for the Journal of the Royal Sanitary Institute. In 1922 she presented at least a hundred lectures to the public.

In 1928 Petty began presenting talks on the radio on 2LO station for the BBC. She spoke on the "Household Talk" series of programmes on topics such as cooking vegetables, puddings, "Making the most of a Minimum Wage", "Dinners for a Week on a Minimum Wage" and children's diets. According to the cultural historian Maggie Andrews, her broadcasts showed a "homely, economical and pragmatic approach to cooking and budgeting". Perkins notes that she was a popular broadcaster with the listeners.

Petty continued to work into the mid-1940s, when she was in her seventies. She died of acute bronchitis on 18 November 1948 at home in Hampstead.

Works
 The Pudding Lady: A New Departure in Social Work (1910; co-written with M. E. Bibby and E. G. Colles) 
 "Fireless Cookery" (1916; pamphlet)
 The Pudding Lady's Recipe Book, with Practical Hints (1917) 
 Chapters "Cookery and Vitamines"  and "Care of Children's Teeth" included in The Gateway to Health by Charles Hecht (1921) 
 
 Chapter "Cookery for Infants and Children under School Age" included in Mothercraft: A Selection from Courses of Lectures on Infant Care by the National Association for the Prevention of Infant Mortality (1931)

References and sources

References

Sources

 
 
 
 
 
 
 
 
 
 
 
 
 
 
 
 
 
 
 
 
 
 
 
 
 
 
 
 
 
 
 
 
 
 
 

1870 births
1948 deaths
20th-century British women writers
20th-century British non-fiction writers
Scottish food writers
People from Montrose, Angus
People from Hampstead
Women cookbook writers
Women food writers